Netcong may refer to the following in the U.S. state of New Jersey:

Netcong, New Jersey, a Borough in Morris County
Netcong (NJT station)
Netcong Circle
Netcong School District

See also